Wettsteinina is a genus of 23 fungi in the class Dothideomycetes. The type species Wettsteinina gigantospora was first described by Franz Xaver Rudolf von Höhnel in 1907. The relationship of this taxon to other taxa within the class is unknown (incertae sedis).

See also
List of Dothideomycetes genera incertae sedis

References

Dothideomycetes enigmatic taxa
Dothideomycetes genera
Taxa named by Franz Xaver Rudolf von Höhnel
Taxa described in 1907